The simple station Biblioteca Tintal is part of the TransMilenio mass-transit system of Bogotá, Colombia, which opened in the year 2000.

Location 
The station is located in southwestern Bogotá, specifically on Avenida Ciudad de Cali with Calles 1B and 33 Sur.

It serves the María Paz and Tairona neighborhoods. The Tintal Plaza shopping center is located nearby.

History 
In May 2004, the Avenida de Las Américas line was extended along Avenida Ciudad de Cali. This station was included in that extension.

The station is named Biblioteca Tintal due to its proximity to one of the city's mega-libraries, located on the site of a former factory. This station has a "Punto de Encuentro" or meeting point, which has restrooms, a coffee shop, a parking for bicycles and an attention booth for tourists.

Station services

Old trunk services

Main line service

Feeder routes 
This station does not have connections to feeder routes.

Inter-city service 
This station does not have inter-city service.

See also 
 Bogotá
 TransMilenio
 List of TransMilenio stations

External links 
 TransMilenio

TransMilenio